Higbald of Lindisfarne (or Hygebald) was Bishop of Lindisfarne from 780 or 781 until his death on 25 May 803. Little is known about his life except that he was a regular communicator with Alcuin of York; it is in his letters to Alcuin that Higbald described in graphic detail the Viking raid on Lindisfarne on 8 June 793 in which many of his monks were killed.

Higbald has long been thought to be identical with the Speratus addressed in a letter by Alcuin of 797, but this is no longer viewed as likely.

Citations

References

External links 
 

803 deaths
8th-century Christian monks
Bishops of Lindisfarne
8th-century English bishops
9th-century English bishops
Year of birth unknown
8th-century English writers
8th-century Latin writers
Latin letter writers